Gilbert Álvarez Vargas (born 7 April 1992) is a Bolivian professional footballer who plays as a forward for Wilstermann in Bolivia on loan from Saudi Pro League side Al-Hazem.

Club career 
Álvarez played for several youth teams in his home city of Santa Cruz in Bolivia, including Club Destroyers and Club Callejas.

In August 2010, Álvarez was signed by Cruzeiro of Brazil. He did not play a first team game for Cruzeiro prior to the 2011 Copa America, and he was not named in Bolivia's squad for the tournament.

In August 2011, Álvarez announced that he was considering a move to Europe, citing that talks between his agent and one club in Germany and another in Italy were underway.

International career
During his time with Callejas, he was called up by the Bolivia under-17s to play as their lone striker in the 2009 South American Under-17 Football Championship. He scored three goals in the tournament, including a double against Ecuador under-17s in the final group stage.

Later in 2009, as a 17-year-old, Álvarez was called up to the senior Bolivia side. He made his first senior international appearance as a substitute against Venezuela in a qualifying match for the 2010 FIFA World Cup on 6 June 2009. He gained a second cap the following year in a 5–0 friendly match defeat to Mexico in February 2010.

International goals
Scores and results list Bolivia's goal tally first.

Personal life
Álvarez comes from a large family, being the fifth of thirteen children. He harbours aspirations to play in Europe, declaring in a 2009 interview that he was delighted by reported interest in his signature from Lazio and that his ultimate ambition was to play for Manchester United.

References

External links

1992 births
Living people
2019 Copa América players
2021 Copa América players
Al-Hazem F.C. players
Association football forwards
Bolivian expatriate footballers
Bolivian footballers
Bolivia international footballers
C.D. Jorge Wilstermann players
Club Real Potosí players
Copa América Centenario players
Cruzeiro Esporte Clube players
Expatriate footballers in Brazil
Expatriate footballers in Saudi Arabia
People from Santa Cruz de la Sierra
Saudi Professional League players
The Strongest players